Cape Charcot is a rocky headland at the northeast end of the Melba Peninsula,  west of David Island. It was discovered by the Australasian Antarctic Expedition under Mawson, 1911–14, who named it for Dr. Jean-Baptiste Charcot, French Antarctic explorer.

References 

Headlands of Queen Mary Land